Kendra C. Johnson (born December 26, 1976) is an American actress. She is best known for her role as Linda Love-Harris in the  sitcom Tyler Perry's Love Thy Neighbor.

Career
During her career, she has done many acting roles in the entertainment industry including her roles as Stacey in the movie Phat Girlz and recurring role as Renee in The CW/BET series The Game. In May 2013, it was announced she would join the cast of the new sitcom Love Thy Neighbor. She is the star of the hit OWN TV series.

Filmography

References

External links
 

Living people
1976 births
American television actresses
21st-century American women